The Chrysler Natrium is a hybrid fuel cell-type hydrogen vehicle based on the Chrysler Town and Country. It was showcased by Chrysler in 2001. 

The Natrium is powered by a battery pack and a fuel cell using hydrogen produced by a sodium borohydride reformer inside the car. Because the reactant (sodium borohydride, NaBH4) contains no carbon, the vehicle produces no carbon dioxide.

References

Sources
 V. Hovland, A. Pesaran, R. Mohring, I.Eason, R. Schaller, D. Tran, T. Smith, G. Smith, “Water and Heat Balance in a Fuel Cell Vehicle With a Sodium Borohydride Hydrogen Fuel Processor.” Society of Automotive Engineer Technical paper 2003-01-2271.
 A Schell, H. Peng, D. Tran, E. Stamos, C.C. Lin, M.J. Kim.  “Modeling and control strategy development for fuel cell electric vehicles.”  Annual Reviews in Control 29 (2005) 159–168.

External links 
 Chrysler Natrium at allpar

Natrium
Fuel cell vehicles